Mervyn Ernest "Bunoo" Sutton (2 June 1909 – 20 December 1956) was an Indian sprinter. He competed in the men's 100 metres at the 1932 Summer Olympics.

References

External links
 

1909 births
1956 deaths
Athletes (track and field) at the 1932 Summer Olympics
Indian male sprinters
Olympic athletes of India
People from Jabalpur
Anglo-Indian people